The Wahinda are a clan or class (better than a tribe) of Eastern Africa, especially Uganda, Tanzania, Rwanda and Burundi, where they had a ruling role among different tribes.

They originated from the North as shown by their physical aspect 

The Wahinda believed the drum was so holy that seeing one of them would be fatal to any person other than the sultan.

The late Sam Magara, a Ugandan military leader, was from the Muhinda clan of the Bahima.

References

Ethnic groups in Burundi
Ethnic groups in Tanzania
Ethnic groups in Uganda
Ethnic groups in Rwanda